The chain of command leads from the President (as commander-in-chief) through the Secretary of Defense down to the newest recruits. The United States armed forces are organized through the United States Department of Defense, which oversees a complex structure of joint command and control functions with many units reporting to various commanding officers. The following is an incomplete list of the various major military units, commands, and DOD offices and agencies, including civilian and military chains of command.

Secretary of Defense
 Secretary of Defense: Lloyd Austin 
Deputy Secretary of Defense: Kathleen Hicks

Office of the Secretary of Defense 

 Under Secretary of Defense Comptroller/Chief Financial Officer
 Principal Deputy Under Secretary of Defense (Comptroller)
 Director for Program Analysis and Evaluation
 Under Secretary of Defense for Acquisition, Technology and Logistics
 Director of Defense Research and Engineering
 Deputy Under Secretary of Defense (Acquisition and Technology)
 Deputy Under Secretary of Defense (Logistics and Material Readiness)
 Assistant to the Secretary of Defense (Nuclear and Chemical and Biological Defense Programs)
 Director of Small and Disadvantaged Business Utilization
 Deputy Under Secretary of Defense (Acquisition Reform)
 Deputy Under Secretary of Defense (Advanced Systems and Concepts)
 Deputy Under Secretary of Defense (Environmental Security)
 Deputy Under Secretary of Defense (Industrial Affairs)
 Deputy Under Secretary of Defense (Installations)
 Deputy Under Secretary of Defense (Science and Technology)
 Under Secretary of Defense for Personnel and Readiness
 Assistant Secretary of Defense (Force Management Policy)
 Assistant Secretary of Defense (Health Affairs)
 Assistant Secretary of Defense (Reserve Affairs)
 Deputy Under Secretary of Defense (Readiness)
 Deputy Under Secretary of Defense (Program Integration)
 Deputy Under Secretary of Defense (Planning)
 Under Secretary of Defense for Policy
 Principal Deputy Under Secretary of Defense (Policy)
 Assistant Secretary of Defense (International Security Affairs)
 Assistant Secretary of Defense (Strategy and Threat Reduction)
 Assistant Secretary of Defense (Special Operations and Low-Intensity Conflict)
 Deputy Under Secretary of Defense (Policy Support)
 Deputy Under Secretary of Defense (Technology Security Policy)
 Defense Advisor, U.S. Mission NATO
 Under Secretary of Defense for Intelligence and Security
 Assistant Secretary of Defense (Command, Control, Communications, and Intelligence)
 Assistant Secretary of Defense (Legislative Affairs)
 Assistant Secretary of Defense for Public Affairs
 General Counsel of the Department of Defense
 Director of Operational Test and Evaluation
 Assistant to the Secretary of Defense (Intelligence Oversight)
 Director of Administration and Management
 Director of Net Assessment

Office of the Inspector General
 Inspector General of the Department of Defense: Glenn A. Fine
 Principal Deputy Inspector General
 Dean of Instruction
 EEO
 Senior Military Officer
 Assistant Inspector General for Administration and Management
 Assistant Inspector General, Congressional/Committee Liaison
 General Counsel
 Deputy Inspector General for Auditing
 Principal Assistant Inspector General (Audit)
 Assistant Inspector General (Auditing)
 Deputy Assistant Inspector General (Auditing)
 Service Audit Agencies
 Deputy Inspector General for Policy and Oversight
 Assistant Inspector General (Audit Policy Oversight)
 Assistant Inspector General (Inspection & Evaluations)
 Assistant Inspector General (Investigation Policy & Oversight)
 Director of Hotline
 Director of AFU
 Director of QMD
 Director of TAD
 Director of Data Mining
 Service Inspector Generals
 Deputy Inspector General for Investigations
 Director for Investigations of Senior Officials
 Director for Military Reprisal Investigation
 Director for Civilian Reprisal Investigation
 Director for Defense Criminal Investigative Service
 Deputy Director for Defense Criminal Investigative Service
 U.S. Army Criminal Investigation Command
 Naval Criminal Investigative Service
 Air Force Office of Special Investigations
 Deputy Inspector General for Intelligence and Security
 Deputy Assistant Inspector General (Intelligence Audits)
 Deputy Assistant Inspector General (Intelligence Evaluation)
 National Reconnaissance Office
 Defense Intelligence Agency
 National Security Agency
 National Geospatial-Intelligence Agency

Organization of the Joint Chiefs of Staff and Joint Staff

 Chairman of the Joint Chiefs of Staff: General Mark A. Milley, USA
Vice Chairman of the Joint Chiefs of Staff: Admiral Christopher W. Grady, USN
Chief of Staff of the Army: General James C. McConville, USA
 Commandant of the Marine Corps: General David H. Berger, USMC
 Chief of Naval Operations: Admiral Michael M. Gilday, USN
 Chief of Staff of the Air Force: General Charles Q. Brown Jr., USAF
 Chief of the National Guard Bureau: General Daniel R. Hokanson, USAF
Chief of Space Operations: General B. Chance Saltzman, USSF

Joint Staff
 Assistant to the Chairman
 Senior Enlisted Advisor of the Chairman
 Director, Joint Staff
 Manpower and Personnel (J-1)
 Joint Staff Intelligence (J-2)
 Operations (J-3)
 Logistics (J-4)
 Strategic Plans and Policy (J-5)
 Operational Plans and Interoperability (J-7)
 Force Structure Resources and Assessment (J-8)
 Directorate of Management

Military Departments

Department of the Army 

 Secretary of the Army

Office of the Secretary of the Army 
 Under Secretary of the Army
 Inspector General of the Army
 Army Auditor General
 Deputy Under Secretary of the Army
 Deputy Under Secretary of the Army for Business Transformation
 Chief, Legislative Liaison
 Chief, Public Affairs
 Small and Disadvantaged Business Utilization Office
 General Counsel of the Army
 Administrative Assistant to the Secretary of the Army
 Assistant Secretary of the Army (Acquisition, Logistics and Technology)
 Assistant Secretary of the Army (Civil Works)
 Assistant Secretary of the Army (Financial Management and Comptroller)
 Assistant Secretary of the Army (Installations, Energy and Environment)
 Assistant Secretary of the Army (Manpower and Reserve Affairs)
 Chief Information Officer
 United States Army Network Enterprise Technology Command/9th Signal Command
 Director, Army Staff
 The United States Military Academy
 United States Army Intelligence and Security Command
 United States Army Test and Evaluation Command
 United States Army Criminal Investigation Command
 United States Army Medical Command
 United States Army Military District of Washington
 United States Army Corps of Engineers
 United States Army Reserve Command
 United States Army Acquisition Support Center

The Army Staff 
 Chief of Staff of the Army
 Vice Chief of Staff of the Army
 Director, Army Staff
 Deputy Chief of Staff (Manpower/Personnel) (G-1)
 Army Chief of Staff for Installation Management
 Chief of Engineers
 Deputy Chief of Staff (Logistics) (G-4)
 Deputy Chief of Staff (Programs/Financial Management) (G-8)
 Deputy Chief of Staff (Intelligence) (G-2)
 Deputy Chief of Staff (Plans, Operations and Transformation) (G-3/5/7)
 Sergeant Major of the Army
 Judge Advocate General
 Chief, Army Reserve
 Provost Marshal General
 The Surgeon General
 Chief of Chaplains
 United States Army Installation Management Command
 United States Army Training and Doctrine Command
 United States Army Materiel Command
 United States Army Forces Command
 United States Army Africa
 United States Army Central
 United States Army Europe
 United States Army North
 United States Army South
 United States Army Pacific
 United States Army Special Operations Command
 Military Surface Deployment and Distribution Command
 United States Army Space and Missile Defense Command/Army Strategic Command
 Eighth United States Army

Department of the Navy 

 Secretary of the Navy

Office of the Secretary of the Navy 
 Under Secretary of the Navy
 Chief of Information
 Chief of Legislative Affairs
 Auditor General
 Assistant for Administration
 Director of Small and Disadvantaged Business Utilization
 Assistant Secretary of the Navy (Research, Development, and Acquisition)
 Chief of Naval Research
 Assistant Secretary of the Navy (Manpower and Reserve Affairs)
 Assistant Secretary of the Navy (Financial Management and Comptroller)
 Assistant Secretary of the Navy (Installations and Environment)
 General Counsel of the Navy
 Chief Information Officer
 Judge Advocate General of the Navy
 Naval Inspector General
 Director of Program Appraisal

Office of the Chief of Naval Operations 
 Chief of Naval Operations
 Director of Naval Nuclear Propulsion Program (NooN)
 Master Chief Petty Officer of the Navy (MCPON)
 Vice Chief of Naval Operations
 Director, Navy Staff (DNS)
 Director, Test & Evaluation Technical Requirements (No91)
 Surgeon General of the Navy (No93)
 Chief of Navy Reserve (No95)
 Chief of Chaplains (N097)
 Deputy Chief of Naval Operations (DCNO) Manpower, Personnel, Education and Training (N1)
 Director of Naval Intelligence (N2)
 DCNO Information, Plans, & Strategy (N3/N5)
 Director for Material Readiness & Logistics (N4)
 DCNO Communication Networks (N6)
 DCNO Warfighting Development (N7)
 DCNO Integration of Capabilities & Resources (N8)
 Bureau of Naval Personnel
 Bureau of Medicine and Surgery
 Naval Sea Systems Command
 Naval Air Systems Command
 Naval Facilities Engineering Command
 Naval Supply Systems Command
 Space and Naval Warfare Systems Command
 Strategic Systems Command
 United States Naval Academy
 Naval Education and Training Command
 Naval Meteorology and Oceanography Command
 Naval Legal Service Command
 United States Naval Observatory
 Naval Strike and Air Warfare Center
 Naval Safety Center
 Naval Security Group Command
 Naval Reserve Forces
 Operational Test & Evaluation Forces
 Naval Special Warfare Command
 U.S. Naval Forces Central Command
 Naval Network Warfare Command 
 U.S. Naval Forces Europe
 Military Sealift Command
 U.S. Fleet Forces Command
 U.S. Pacific Fleet
 Naval Installations Command
 Director of Naval Nuclear Propulsion

Headquarters Marine Corps 

 Commandant of the Marine Corps
 Counsel for the Commandant
 Chaplain of the Marine Corps
 Sergeant Major of the Marine Corps
 Marine Corps Combat Development Command
 Marine Corps Recruiting Command
 Marine Barracks Washington, DC
 Assistant Commandant of the Marine Corps
 Marine Corps Systems Command
 Marine Corps National Capital Region
 Safety Division
 Director Marine Corps Staff
 Deputy Commandant (DC) Manpower & Reserve Affairs
 DC Plans, Policy & Operations
 DC Aviation
 DC Installations & Logistics
 DC Combat Development
 DC Programs & Resources
 Command, Control, Communications & Computers
 Health Services
 Inspector General of the Marine Corps
 Intelligence
 Legislative Assistant to the Commandant
 Public Affairs
 Staff Judge Advocate to the Marine Corps

Department of the Air Force 

 Secretary of the Air Force: Barbara Barrett

Office of the Secretary of the Air Force 
 Under Secretary of the Air Force
 Administrative Assistant
 Auditor General
 Assistant Secretary of the Air Force (Acquisition)
 Director of Communication
 Assistant Secretary of the Air Force (Financial Management and Comptroller)
 Assistant Secretary of the Air Force (Installations, Environment and Logistics)
 Deputy Under Secretary of the Air Force (International Affairs)
 Assistant Secretary of the Air Force (Manpower and Reserve Affairs)
 Director of Public Affairs
 Director, Legislative Liaison
 Inspector General of the Department of the Air Force
 General Counsel of the Department of the Air Force
 Chief of Warfighting Integration
 Chief Information Officer
 Air Force Historian
 Director of Test and Evaluation
 Chief Scientist of the Air Force

The Air Staff 

 Chief of Staff (AF/CC)
 Chief Master Sergeant of the Air Force (CMSAF)
 Vice Chief of Staff (AF/CV)
 Director of Staff (AF/DS)
 Deputy Chief of Staff (Personnel) (A1)
 Deputy Chief of Staff (Intelligence, Surveillance and Reconnaissance) (A2)
 Deputy Chief of Staff (Air, Space and Information Operations, Plans and Requirements) (A3/5)
 Deputy Chief of Staff (Logistics, Installations and Mission Support) (A4/7)
 Deputy Chief of Staff (Strategic Plans and Programs) (A8)
 Director for Studies Analyses, Assessments and Lessons Learned (A9)
 Judge Advocate General (AF/JA)
 Air Force Historian (AF/HO)
 Chief, Air Force Reserve (AF/RE)
 Director, Air National Guard (NGB/CF)
 Director, Test and Evaluation (AF/TE)
 Chief of Chaplain Services (AF/HC)
 Chief of Safety (AF/SE)
 Chief Scientist (AF/ST)
 Surgeon General of the Air Force (AF/SG)
 Air Combat Command
 Air Education and Training Command
 Air Force Materiel Command
 Air Force Reserve Command
 Air Force Special Operations Command
 Air Force Global Strike Command
 Air Mobility Command
 Pacific Air Forces
 U.S. Air Forces in Europe

Space Staff 

 Chief of Space Operations
 Vice Chief of Space Operations
 Director of Staff
 Deputy Chief of Space Operations for Personnel and Logistics
 Deputy Chief of Space Operations for Operations, Cyber, and Nuclear
 Deputy Chief of Space Operations for Strategy, Plans, Programs, Requirements and Analysis
 Space Operations Command
 Space Systems Command
 Chief Master Sergeant of the Space Force

Combatant commands

U.S. Africa Command 

 Commander, USAFRICOM: General Stephen J. Townsend, USA

U.S. Central Command 

 Commander, USCENTCOM: General Michael E. Kurilla, USA

U.S. European Command 

 Commander, USEUCOM: General Christopher G. Cavoli, USA
 Deputy Commander, Lieutenant General Michael L. Howard, USA
 Chief of Staff: Major General John D. Lamontagne, USAF
 Command Senior Enlisted Advisor: Command Sergeant Major Robert V. Abernethy, USA

Order of battle 
 US Army Europe (USAREUR), 7th US Army
 V Corps (Heidelberg, Germany) (inactivated 12 June 2013)
 2nd Cavalry Regiment
 12th Combat Aviation Brigade
 170th Infantry Brigade (Inactivation ceremony held 9 October 2012)
 172nd Infantry Brigade (Inactivated 31 May 2013)
 173rd Airborne Brigade Combat Team
 357th Air & Missile Defense Detachment
 21st Sustainment Command (Theater)
 16th Sustainment Brigade
 18th Engineer Brigade
 18th Military Police Brigade
 405th Army Field Support Brigade
 5th Signal Command
 2nd Signal Brigade
 7th Tactical Theater Signal Brigade
 7th Army Joint Multinational Training Command (Grafenwöhr)
 66th Military Intelligence Brigade
 202nd Military Police Group (CID)
 Europe Regional Medical Command
 Joint Task Force East, Romania
 Multi-National Task Force East, Kosovo

U.S. Northern Command 

 Commander, USNORTHCOM: General Glen D. VanHerck, USAF
 Deputy Commander, USNORTHCOM: Lieutenant General A. C. Roper, USA
 Chief of Staff: Rear Admiral Michael P. Holland, USN
 Command Senior Enlisted Leader: Sergeant Major James K. Porterfield, USMC

Order of battle 
 United States Northern Command (USNORTHCOM) (Peterson AFB, CO)
 North American Aerospace Defense Command (NORAD) (Peterson AFB, CO)
 Cheyenne Mountain Operations Center (Peterson AFB, CO)
 1st Air Force / Continental US (CONUS) NORAD Region (Tyndall AFB, FL)
 Eastern Air Defense Sector (The Northeast took over the Southeast's role in 2007) (NY ANG) (Rome, NY)
 104th Fighter Wing (MA ANG) (F-15C, C-26B) (Barnes MAP, MA)
125th Fighter Wing (FL ANG) (F-15A/B, C-26B) (Jacksonville IAP, FL)
 Detachment 1 (FL ANG) (F-15A/B) (Homestead ARB, FL)
 158th Fighter Wing (VT ANG) (F-16C/D, C-26B) (Burlington IAP, VT)
 Detachment 1, 119th Fighter Wing (ND ANG) (F-16A/B) (Langley AFB, VA)
 Western Air Defense Sector (WA ANG) (McChord AFB, WA)
 142nd Fighter Wing (OR ANG) (F-15A/B, C-26B) (Portland IAP, OR)
 119th Fighter Wing (ND ANG) (F-16A/B, C-26B) (Hector Fd, ND)
 120th Fighter Wing (MT ANG) (F-15C, C-26B) (Great Falls IAP, MT)
 144th Fighter Wing (CA ANG) (F-16C/D, C-26B) (Fresno Yosemite AIP, CA)
 Detachment 1 (CA ANG) (F-16C/D) (March ARB, CA)
 148th Fighter Wing (MN ANG) (F-16A/B, C-26B) (Duluth IAP, MN)
 (11th Air Force / Alaska NORAD Region (Elmendorf AFB, AK))
 (611th Air and Space Operations Center (Elmendorf AFB, AK))
 (176th Air Control Squadron/Alaskan Air Defense Sector (AK ANG) (Elmendorf AFB, AK))
 (1 Canadian Air Division/Canadian NORAD Region (Winnipeg, MB))
 US Army North / US Army Forces Command (FORSCOM) (Ft Sam Houston, TX)
 Joint Force Headquarters-National Capital Region (JFHQ-NCR) (Ft McNair, DC)
 1st and 4th Battalions, 3rd Infantry Regiment (Ft Myer, VA)
 Military District of Washington (MDW) (Ft McNair, DC)
 11th Wing / Air Force District of Washington (Bolling AFB, DC)
 Naval District Washington (NDW) (Washington Navy Yard, DC)
 Marine Corps National Capital Region Command (MCNCRC) (MCB Quantico, VA)
 Joint Task Force-Alaska (Elmendorf AFB, AK)
JTF North (formerly JTF 6) and other JTFs

U.S. Indo-Pacific Command 

 Commander, USINDOPACOM: Admiral John C. Aquilino, USN

Order of battle 
 United States Indo-Pacific Command
 United States Army Pacific
 United States Army Japan
 9th Mission Support Command
 10th Support Group
 17th Area Support Group
 300th Area Support Group
 United States Army Alaska
 1st Brigade Combat Team, 25th Infantry Division
 4th Brigade Combat Team (Airborne), 25th Infantry Division
 3rd Maneuver Enhancement Brigade
 16th Combat Aviation Brigade
 United States Army Hawaii
 25th Infantry Division
 196th Infantry Brigade
 516th Signal Brigade
 United States Pacific Fleet
 3rd Fleet
 CTF-30/ Battle Force
 CTF-31/ Combat Support Force
 CTF-32/ Patrol and Reconnaissance Force
 CTF-33/ Logistic Support Force
 CTF-34/ Submarine Force
 CTF-35/ Surface Combatant Force
 CTF-36/ Landing Force
 CTF-37/ Amphibious Force
 CTF-38/ Carrier Strike Force
 7th Fleet
 CTF-70/ Battle Force
 CTF-71/ Combat Support Force
 CTF-72/ Patrol and Reconnaissance Force
 CTF-73/ Logistic Support Force
 CTF-74/ Submarine Force
 CTF-75/ Surface Combatant Force
 CTF-76/ Amphibious Force
 CTF-77/ Carrier Strike Force
 CTF-79/ Landing Force
 Naval Surface Forces, United States Pacific Fleet
 Destroyer Squadron 1
 Destroyer Squadron 7
 Destroyer Squadron 15
 Destroyer Squadron 21
 Destroyer Squadron 23
 Destroyer Squadron 28
 Carrier Group 1
 Carrier Group 3
 Carrier Group 5
 Carrier Group 7
 Cruiser Destroyer Group 1
 Cruiser Destroyer Group 3
 Cruiser Destroyer Group 5
 Surface Group PACNORWEST
 Surface Group MIDPAC
 Logistics Group WESTPAC
 Amphibious Group 1
 Amphibious Group 3
 Explosive Ordnance Disposal Group 1
 Naval Submarine Forces, United States Pacific Fleet
 Submarine Group 7
 Submarine Group 9
 Naval Air Forces, United States Pacific Fleet
 Fleet Air, West Pacific
 Airborne Early Warning Wing
 VAW-112
 VAW-113
 VAW-115
 VAW-116
 VAW-117
 VRC-30
 Naval Region, Southwest
 Naval Region, Northwest
 Naval Region, Hawaii
 Maritime Defense Zone Pacific
 United States Naval Forces Marianas
 Marine Forces Pacific
 I Marine Expeditionary Force (I MEF)
 I Marine Expeditionary Force Headquarters Group (I MEF HQ GRP)
 3rd Marine Division (3rd MARDIV)
 1st Marine Aircraft Wing (1st MAW)
 1st Marine Logistics Group (1st MLG)
 3rd Marine Expeditionary Brigade (3rd MEB)
 31st Marine Expeditionary Unit (31st MEU)
 III Marine Expeditionary Force (III MEF)
 III Marine Expeditionary Force Headquarters Group (III MEF HQ GRP)
 1st Marine Division (1st MARDIV)
 3rd Marine Aircraft Wing (3rd MAW)
 3rd Marine Logistics Group (3rd MLG)
 1st Marine Expeditionary Brigade (1st MEB)
 11th Marine Expeditionary Unit (11th MEU)
 13th Marine Expeditionary Unit (13th MEU)
 15th Marine Expeditionary Unit (15th MEU)
 United States Pacific Air Forces
 United States Forces, Japan
 United States Forces, Korea
 Alaskan Command
 United States Army Alaska
 Eleventh Air Force
 United States Naval Forces, Alaska
 Special Operations Command Pacific
 Asia-Pacific Center for Security Studies
 Information Systems Support Activity
 Pacific Automated Server Site Japan
 Cruise Missile Support Activity
 Special Intelligence Communications
 Joint Intelligence Center Pacific
 Joint Intelligence Training Activity Pacific
 Joint Interagency Task Force West
 Joint Task Force Full-Accounting

U.S. Southern Command 

 Commander, USSOUTHCOM: General Laura J. Richardson, USA
 Deputy Commander, USSOUTHCOM: Lieutenant General Andrew A. Croft, USAF
 Chief-of-Staff, USSOUTHCOM: Rear Admiral Yvette M. Davids, USN
 Command Sergeant Major, USSOUTHCOM: Command Sergeant Major Benjamin Jones, USA
 United States Army South (Fort Sam Houston, TX)
 1st Battalion, 228th Aviation Regiment (Soto Cano AB, Honduras)
 56th Signal Battalion (Fort Sam Houston, TX)
 United States Naval Forces Southern Command (Naval Station Mayport, FL)
 Naval Surface Group Two
 Destroyer Squadron Six
 Destroyer Squadron Fourteen
 II Marine Expeditionary Force (II MEF)/ United States Marine Corps Forces, South (Camp Lejeune, NC)
 II Marine Expeditionary Force Headquarters Group (II MEF HQ GRP)
 2nd Marine Division (2nd MARDIV)
 2nd Marine Aircraft Wing (2nd MAW)
 2nd Marine Logistics Group (2nd MLG)
 2nd Marine Expeditionary Brigade (2nd MEB)
 22nd Marine Expeditionary Unit (22nd MEU)
 24th Marine Expeditionary Unit (24th MEU)
 26th Marine Expeditionary Unit (26th MEU)
 Air Contingency Marine Air Ground Task Force
 Twelfth Air Force/ United States Southern Command Air Forces (Davis Monthan AFB, AZ)
 7th Bomb Wing
 28th Bomb Wing
 49th Fighter Wing
 355th Wing
 366th Wing
 388th Fighter Wing
 1st Air Support Operations Group
 3rd Combat Communications Group
 612th Air Operation Group
 820th RED HORSE Squadron
 Special Operations Command South
 Southern Surveillance Reconnaissance Operations Center
 Joint Interagency Task Force East (NAF Key West, FL)
 Joint Interagency Task Force West
 Joint Task Force Guantanamo (Guantanamo Bay, Cuba)
 Joint Task Force Bravo (Soto Cano AB, Honduras)
 612th Air Base Squadron
 Army Forces
 Medical Elements
 1st Battalion, 228th Aviation Regiment
 Joint Security Forces
 Joint Task Force Piton

United States Army Forces Command (FORSCOM) (Fort Bragg, NC) 
 I Corps
 2nd Brigade Combat Team, 2nd Infantry Division (Stryker brigade), Joint Base Lewis-McChord
 3rd Brigade Combat Team, 2nd Infantry Division (Stryker brigade), Fort Lewis
 17th Field Artillery Brigade, Fort Lewis
 Military Intelligence Brigade, Fort Lewis
 555th Engineer Brigade, Fort Lewis
 593rd Expeditionary Sustainment Command, Fort Lewis
 42nd Military Police Brigade, Fort Lewis
 62nd Medical Brigade, Fort Lewis
 III Corps (United States) (Fort Hood, TX)
 1st Armored Division, Fort Bliss
 1st Cavalry Division, Fort Hood
 1st Infantry Division, Fort Riley
 4th Infantry Division, Fort Carson
 3rd Cavalry Regiment, Fort Hood
 III Corps Artillery, Fort Sill
 41st Fires Brigade, Fort Hood
 75th Fires Brigade, Fort Sill
 212th Fires Brigade, Fort Bliss
 214th Fires Brigade, Fort Sill
 36th Engineer Brigade, Fort Hood
 504th Battlefield Surveillance Brigade, Fort Hood
 89th Military Police Brigade, Fort Hood
 13th Sustainment Command, Fort Hood
 XVIII Airborne Corps (Fort Bragg, NC)
 3rd Infantry Division, Fort Stewart
 10th Mountain Division (Light Infantry), Fort Drum
 82nd Airborne Division, Fort Bragg
 101st Airborne Division (Air Assault), Fort Campbell
 18th Fires Brigade, Fort Bragg
 20th Engineer Brigade, Fort Bragg
 525th Battlefield Surveillance Brigade, Fort Bragg
 16th Military Police Brigade, Fort Bragg
 44th Medical Brigade, Fort Bragg
 32nd Army Air & Missile Defense Command (Ft Bliss, TX)
 11th Air Defense Artillery Brigade (Ft Bliss, TX)
 31st Air Defense Artillery Brigade (Fort Sill, OK)
 35th Air Defense Artillery Brigade (Osan AB, South Korea)
 69th Air Defense Artillery Brigade (Fort Hood, TX)
 108th Air Defense Artillery Brigade (Fort Bragg, NC)
 Detachment 1 (FL ARNG) (Orlando, FL)
 Network Enterprise Technology Command (NETCOM) / 9th Army Signal Command (Ft Huachuca, AZ)
 11th Signal Brigade (Ft Huachuca, AZ)
 21st Signal Brigade (Ft Detrick, MD)
 5th Signal Command (Mannheim, Germany)
 311th Signal Command (United States)(Multi-Component) (Ft Shafter, HI)
 1st Signal Brigade (Seoul, South Korea)
 335th Theater Signal Command (USAR) (East Point, GA (Deployed to Kuwait))
 160th Signal Brigade (Strategic) (Camp Arifjan, Kuwait)
 93rd Signal Brigade (Ft Gordon, GA)
 516th Signal Brigade (Ft Shafter, HI)
 52nd Ordnance Group (Ft Campbell, KY)
 111th Ordnance Group (AL ARNG) (Ft Gillem, GA)
 National Training Center (NTC) (Ft Irwin, CA)
 11th Armored Cavalry Regiment (OPFOR) (Ft Irwin, CA)
 Joint Readiness Training Center (JRTC) (Ft Polk, LA)
 Warrior Brigade (Support) (Ft Polk, LA)
 1st Army (Rock Island Arsenol, IL)
First Army Division East (Ft Meade, MD)
157th Infantry Brigade "Spartan" (Fort Jackson, SC)
158th Infantry Brigade "Warrior" (Patrick Space Force Base, FL)
174th Infantry Brigade "Patriot" (Fort Drum, NY)
188th Infantry Brigade "Battle Ready" (Fort Stewart, GA)
205th Infantry Brigade "Bayonet" (Camp Atterbury, IN)
177th Armored Brigade "Mudcats" (Camp Shelby, MS)
4th Cavalry Brigade "Saber"  (Fort Knox, KY)
72nd Field Artillery Brigade "Warrior Eagle" (Fort Meade, MD)
First Army Division West (Fort Hood, TX)
120th Infantry Brigade (Fort Hood, TX)
166th Aviation Brigade (Fort Hood, TX)
181st Infantry Brigade "Eagle" (Fort McCoy, WI)
191st Infantry Brigade (Fort Lewis, WA)
402nd Field Artillery Brigade (Fort Bliss, TX)
479th Field Artillery Brigade (Fort Hood, TX)
5th Armored Brigade (Fort Bliss, TX)
189th Infantry Brigade "Bayonet" (Fort Hood, TX)
 28th Infantry Division (Mechanized) (PA ARNG) (Harrisburg, PA)
 34th Infantry Division (Medium) (MN ARNG) (Rosemount, MN)
 35th Infantry Division (Mechanized) (KS ARNG) (Ft Leavenworth, KS)
 38th Infantry Division (Mechanized) (IN ARNG) (Indianapolis, IN)
 42nd Infantry Division (Mechanized) (NY ARNG) (Troy, NY)
 29th Infantry Division (VA ARNG) (Ft Belvoir, VA)
 155th Armored Brigade (Enhanced Readiness) (MS ARNG) (Tupelo, MS (Deployed to Iraq))
 27th Infantry Brigade (Light) (Enhanced Readiness) (NY ARNG) (Syracuse, NY)
 32nd Infantry Brigade (Light) (WI ARNG) (Madison, WI)
 76th Infantry Brigade (Light) (Enhanced Readiness) (IN ARNG) (Indianapolis, IN)
 256th Infantry Brigade (Mechanized) (Enhanced Readiness) (LA ARNG) (Lafayette, LA)
 631st Field Artillery Brigade (MS ARNG) (Grenada, MS)
 168th Engineer Group (MS ARNG) (Vicksburg, MS)
 43rd Military Police Brigade (RI ARNG) (Warwick, RI)
 244th Theater Aviation Brigade (Lift) (USAR) (Ft Sheridan, IL)
 31st Chemical Brigade (AL ARNG) (Northport, AL)
 228th Signal Brigade (SC ARNG) (Spartanburg, SC)
 261st Signal Brigade (DE ARNG) (Dover, DE)
 184th Transportation Group (Composite) (MS ARNG) (Laurel, MS)
 78th Division (Training Support) (USAR) (Ft Dix, NJ)
 85th Division (Training Support) (USAR) (Arlington Heights, IL)
 87th Division (Exercise) (USAR) (Birmingham, AL)
 36th Infantry Division (Mechanized) (TX ARNG) (Austin, TX)
 57th Field Artillery Brigade (WI ARNG) (Milwaukee, WI)
 115th Engineer Group (Construction) (UT ARNG) (Draper, UT)
 300th Military Intelligence Brigade (Linguist) (UT ARNG) (Draper, UT)
 75th Division (Training Support) (USAR) (Ft Sam Houston, TX)
 91st Division (Training Support) (USAR) (Ft. Baker, CA)
 67th Area Support Group (NE ARNG) (Lincoln, NE)
 United States Army Reserve Command (USARC) (Ft Bragg, NC)
 63rd Regional Readiness Command (USAR) (Los Alamitos, CA)
 104th Division (Institutional Training) (USAR) (Vancouver Bks, WA)
 653rd Regional Support Group (USAR) (Moreno Valley, CA)
 2nd Medical Brigade (USAR) (Hamilton Fd, CA)
 70th Regional Readiness Command (USAR) (Ft Lawton, WA)
 654th Area Support Group (Tumwater, WA)
 77th Regional Readiness Command (USAR) (Ft Totten, NY)
 800th Military Police Brigade (Enemy Prisoner of War) (USAR) (Uniondale, NY)
 455th Chemical Brigade (USAR) (Ft Dix, NJ)
 98th Division (Institutional Training) (USAR) (Rochester, NY)
 301st Area Support Group (USAR) (Flushing, NY)
 8th Medical Brigade (USAR) (Ft Wadsworth, NY)
 77th Infantry Division (Reinforcement Training Unit) (USAR) (Ft Totten, NY)
 81st Regional Readiness Command (USAR) (Fort Jackson, SC)
 100th Division (Institutional Training) (USAR) (Louisville, KY)
 108th Division (Institutional Training) (USAR) (Charlotte, NC)
 926th Engineer Group (USAR) (Montgomery, AL)
 415th Chemical Brigade (USAR) (Greenville, SC)
 81st Regional Support Group (USAR) (Ft Jackson, SC)
 171st Area Support Group (USAR) (Garner, NC)
 640th Area Support Group (USAR) (Nashville, TN)
 641st Area Support Group (USAR) (St Petersburg, FL)
 642nd Area Support Group (USAR) (Ft Gordon, GA)
 1st Headquarters Brigade (USAR) (Nashville, TN)
 332nd Medical Brigade (USAR) (Nashville, TN)
 5th Medical Group (USAR) (Birmingham, AL)
 88th Regional Readiness Command (USAR) (Fort McCoy, WI)
 84th Division (Institutional Training) (USAR) (Milwaukee, WI)
 300th Military Police Command (USAR) (Inkster, MI)
 303rd Ordnance Group (USAR) (Springfield, IL)
 88th Regional Readiness Group (USAR) (Indianapolis, IN)
 643rd Regional Support Group (USAR) (Whitehall, OH)
 645th Regional Support Group (USAR) (Southfield, MI)
 646th Regional Support Group (USAR) (Madison, WI)
 330th Medical Brigade (USAR) (Ft Sheridan, IL)
 89th Regional Readiness Command (USAR) (Wichita, KS)
 95th Division (Institutional Training) (USAR) (Oklahoma City, OK)
 166th Aviation Brigade (Training Support) (Ft Riley, KS)
 561st Corps Support Group (USAR) (Omaha, NE)
 917th Corps Support Group (USAR) (Belton, MO)
 326th Area Support Group (USAR) (Kansas City, KS)
 648th Area Support Group (USAR) (St Louis, MO)
 331st Medical Group (USAR) (Wichita, KS)
 90th Regional Readiness Command (USAR) (Little Rock AFB, AR)
 647th Regional Support Group (USAR) (El Paso, TX)
 90th Regional Support Group (USAR) (San Antonio, TX)
 94th Regional Readiness Command (USAR) Devens RFTA, MA (inactivated; number assigned to the 94th Division (Force Sustainment), Fort Lee, VA)
 167th Area Support Group (USAR) (Manchester, NH (Deployed to Iraq))
 804th Medical Brigade (USAR) (Devens RFTA, MA)
 96th Regional Readiness Command (USAR) (Ft Douglas, UT)
 99th Regional Readiness Command (USAR) (Moon Township, PA)
 220th Military Police Brigade (USAR) (Gaithersburg, MD)
 367th Military Police Group (USAR) (Ashley, PA)
 80th Division (Institutional Training) (USAR) (Richmond, VA)
 38th Ordnance Group (USAR) (Charleston, WV)
 464th Chemical Brigade (USAR) (Johnstown, PA)
 475th Quartermaster Group (Petroleum & Water) (USAR) (Farrell, PA)
 656th Area Support Group (USAR) (NAS Willow Grove, PA)
 309th Medical Group (USAR) (Rockville, MD)
 99th Headquarters Brigade (USAR) (Willow Grove, PA)

US Air Force Air Combat Command (Langley AFB, VA) 
 (1st Air Force (Tyndall AFB, FL))
 15th Air Force (Shaw AFB, SC)
 1st Fighter Wing (F-15C/D) (Langley AFB, VA)
 33rd Fighter Wing (F-15C/D) (Eglin AFB, FL)
 4th Fighter Wing (F-15E) (Seymour Johnson AFB, NC)
 20th Fighter Wing (SEAD) (F-16CJ/DJ) (Shaw AFB, SC)
 820th Security Forces Group (Moody AFB, GA)
 5th Combat Communications Group (Robins AFB, GA)
 12th Air Force (Davis-Monthan AFB, AZ)
 7th Bomb Wing (B-1B) (Dyess AFB, TX)
 28th Bomb Wing (B-1B) (Ellsworth AFB, SD)
 366th Fighter Wing (Fighter and Bomber) (B-1B, F-15C/D/E, F-16CJ/DJ, KC-135R) (Mountain Home AFB, ID)
 388th Fighter Wing (F-16CG/DJ) (Hill AFB, UT)
 27th Fighter Wing (F-16CG/DG) (Cannon AFB, NM)
 301st Fighter Wing (AFRes) (F-16C/D) (NAS Fort Worth JRB, TX)
 49th Fighter Wing (F-117A, AT-38B, T-38A) (Holloman AFB, NM)
 355th Wing (Fighter and Electronic Countermeasures) (OA/A-10A, EC-130E/H) (Davis-Monthan AFB, AZ)
 507th Air Refueling Wing (AFRes) (KC-135R, E-3B/C, TC-18E) (Tinker AFB, OK)
 10th Air Force (AFRes) (NAS Fort Worth JRB, TX)
 917th Wing (Fighter and Bomber) (AFRes) (B-52H, OA/A-10A) (Barksdale, AFB)
 419th Fighter Wing (AFRes) (F-16C/D) (Hill AFB, UT)
 482d Fighter Wing (AFRes) (F-16C/D) (Homestead ARB, FL)
 442d Fighter Wing (AFRes) (OA/A-10A) (Whiteman AFB, MO)
 926th Fighter Wing (AFRes) (OA/A-10A) (NAS New Orleans JRB, TX)
 920th Rescue Wing (AFRes) (HC-130P, C-130E, HH-60G) (Patrick Space Force Base, FL)
 Air Warfare Center (Nellis AFB, NV)
 53rd Wing (Test and Evaluation) (F-15C/D/E, F-16C/CG/CJ/D/DG/DJ, F-117A, OA/A-10A, E-9A, Boeing 707, QF-4E/G, QRF-4C, HH-60G) (Eglin AFB, FL)
 57th Wing (Combat Training, Test and Evaluation) (F-15C/D/E, F-16C/CG/CJ/D/DG/DJ, OA/A-10A, HH-60G, RQ-1A) (Nellis AFB, NV)
 505th Command and Control Wing (Hurlburt Field, FL)
 99th Air Base Wing (Nellis AFB, NV)
 Air National Guard (ANG)
 131st Fighter Wing (MO ANG) (F-15A/B) (Lambert Fd, St Louis, MO)
 159th Fighter Wing (LA ANG) (F-15A/B, C-130E) (NAS New Orleans JRB, LA)
 113th Wing (Fighter & Airlift) (DC ANG) (F-16C/D, C-21A, C-38A) (Andrews AFB, MD)
 114th Fighter Wing (SD ANG) (F-16C/D) (Joes Foss Fd, Sioux Falls, SD)
 115th Fighter Wing (WI ANG) (F-16C/D, C-26B) (Dane CAP, Truax Fd, WI)
 122nd Fighter Wing (IN ANG) (F-16C/D) (Fort Wayne MAP, IN)
 127th Wing (Fighter and Airlift) (MI ANG) (F-16C/D, C-130E, C-26B) (Selfridge ANBG, MI)
 132nd Fighter Wing (IA ANG) (F-16CG/DG) (Des Moines MAP, IA)
 138th Fighter Wing (OK ANG) (F-16CG/DG) (Tulsa IAP, OK)
 140th Wing (Fighter & Training) (CO ANG) (F-16C/D, C-21A, C-26A) (Buckley Space Force Base, CO)
 150th Fighter Wing (NM ANG) (F-16C/CG/D/DG, C-26B) (Kirtland AFB, NM)
 174th Reconnaissance Wing (NY ANG) (M-9 Reaper) (Syracuse-Hancock Fd, NY)
 177th Fighter Wing (NJ ANG) (F-16C/D) (Atlantic City IAP, NJ)
 180th Fighter Wing (OH ANG) (F-16CG/DG) (Toledo Express AP, OH)
 181st Intelligence Wing (IN ANG) (Hulman Fd, Terre Haute, IN)
 183rd Fighter Wing (IL ANG) (F-16C/D) (Capitol AP, Springfield, IL)
 187th Fighter Wing (AL ANG) (F-16C/D, C-26B) (Montgomery-Dannelly Fd, AL)
 188th Fighter Wing (AR ANG) (F-16C/D) (Ft Rock MAP, AR)
 192nd Fighter Wing (VA ANG) (F-16C/D) (Richard E Byrd IAP, VA)
 169th Fighter Wing (SEAD) (SC ANG) (F-16CJ/D, C-130E) (McEntire ANGB, SC)
 103d Airlift Wing (CT ANG) (O/A-10A) (Bradley ANGB, CT)
 104th Fighter Wing (MA ANG) (O/A-10A) (Barnes MAP, Westfield, MA)
 110th Fighter Wing (MI ANG) (O/A-10A) (Battle Creek ANGB, MI)
 111th Attack Wing (PA ANG) (MQ9 Reaper) (Horsham AGS, PA)
 124th Wing (ID ANG) (O/A-10A) (Boise AT, ID)
 175th Wing (Fighter and Airlift) (MD ANG) (OA/A-10A) (Glenn L Martin AP, Baltimore, MD)
 106th Rescue Wing (NY ANG) (HC-130N/P, HH-60G) (Francis Gabreski ANGB, NY)
 129th Rescue Wing (CA ANG) (HC-130P, HH-60G) (NAS Moffett Fd, CA)
 147th Reconnaissance Wing (TX ANG) (MQ-1 Predator) (Ellington ANGB, Houston, TX)
 163rd Reconnaissance Wing (CA ANG) (MQ-1 Predator) (March AFB, CA)
 102nd Intelligence Wing (MA ANG) (Otis ANGB, Falmouth, MA)
 184th Intelligence Wing (KS ANG) (McConnell AFB, KS)

United States Fleet Forces Command (Norfolk NB, VA) 
 2nd Fleet (NB Norfolk, VA)
 Task Force 20 (2nd Fleet Battle Force)
 Theodore Roosevelt Strike Group / Carrier Strike Group 2 (CARSTRKGRU 2) (NB Norfolk, VA (Surge Ready))
 Harry S. Truman Strike Group / Carrier Strike Group 10 (CARSTRKGRU 10) (NB Norfolk, VA (Post-Deployment))
 John F. Kennedy Strike Group / Carrier Strike Group 6 (CARSTRKGRU 6) (NS Mayport, FL (Post-Deployment))
 Eisenhower Strike Group / Carrier Strike Group 8 (CARSTRKGRU 8) (NB Norfolk, VA (Basic Training))
 Enterprise Strike Group / Cruiser Strike Group 12 (CARSTRKGRU 12) (NB Norfolk, VA (Maintenance))
 George Washington Strike Group (NB Norfolk, VA (Maintenance))
 Carrier Strike Group 14 (CARSTRKGRU 14) (NB Norfolk, VA)
 Task Force 21 (2nd Fleet Patrol Reconnaissance Force) / Patrol and Reconnaissance Force Atlantic Fleet (PATRECONFORLANT) (NS Norfolk, VA)
 Task Force 22 (2nd Fleet Amphibious Force) / Amphibious Group 2 (PHIBGRU 2) (NB Norfolk, VA)
 Kearsarge Expeditionary Strike Group / Expeditionary Strike Group 6 / Amphibious Squadron 8 (PHIBRON 8) (NB Norfolk, VA (Deployed))
 Saipan Expeditionary Strike Group / Expeditionary Strike Group 4 / Amphibious Squadron 2 (PHIBRON 2) (NB Norfolk, VA (Deployed))
 Wasp Expeditionary Strike Group / Expeditionary Strike Group 2 / Amphibious Squadron 4 (PHIBRON 4) (NB Norfolk, VA (Post-Deployment))
 Bataan Expeditionary Strike Group (NAB Little Creek, VA (Intermediate Training))
 Naval Coastal Warfare Group Two (Williamsburg, VA)
 Tactical Air Control Group 2 (TACGRU 2) (NAB Little Creek, VA)
 Naval Beach Group 2 (NAVBEACHGRU 2) (NB Norfolk, VA?)
 Task Force 23 (2nd Fleet Landing Force)
 Task Force 24 (2nd Fleet ASW Force)
 Task Force 25 (2nd Fleet Mobile Logistics Support Force) / Combat Logistics Squadron 2 (LOGRON 2) (NB Norfolk, VA)
 Task Force 26 (2nd Fleet Patrol Air Force) / Patrol and Reconnaissance Force Atlantic Fleet (PATRECONFORLANT) (NS Norfolk, VA)
 Task Force 28 (2nd Fleet Caribbean Contingency Force) (NS Mayport, FL)
 Carrier Group 4 (CARGRU 4) / Carrier Striking Force (Battle Group Training) (NB Norfolk, VA)
 Task Force 40 / Naval Surface Force Atlantic Fleet (NAVSURFLANT) (NB Norfolk, VA)
 Combat Logistics Squadron 2 (COMLOGRON 2) (NWS Earle, NJ)
 Task Force 41 / Naval Air Force Atlantic Fleet (NAVAIRLANT) (NAS Oceana, VA)
 Fighter Wing Atlantic Fleet (FITWINGLANT) (NAS Oceana, VA)
 Strike Fighter Wing Atlantic Fleet (STRIKFIGHTWINGLANT) (NAS Oceana, VA)
 Sea Control Wing Atlantic Fleet (SEACONWINGLANT) (NAS Jacksonville, FL)
 Helicopter Anti-Submarine Wing Atlantic Fleet (HSWINGLANT) (NAS Jacksonville, FL)
 Helicopter Anti-Submarine Light Wing Atlantic Fleet (HSLWINGLANT) (NS Mayport, FL)
 Helicopter Sea Combat Wing Atlantic Fleet (HELSEACOMWINGLANT) (NAS Norfolk, VA)
 Helicopter Sea Combat Squadron TWO (HSC-2) (NAS Norfolk, VA)
 Helicopter Sea Combat Squadron TWENTY TWO (HSC-22) (NAS Norfolk, VA)
 Helicopter Sea Combat Squadron TWENTY SIX (HSC-26) (NAS Norfolk, VA)
 Helicopter Sea Combat Squadron TWENTY EIGHT (HSC-28) (NAS Norfolk, VA)
 Helicopter Sea Combat Squadron EIGHTY FOUR (HSC-84) (NAS Norfolk, VA)
 Helicopter Mine Countermeasures Squadron FOURTEEN (HM-14) (NAS Norfolk, VA)
 Helicopter Mine Countermeasures Squadron FIFTEEN (HM-15) (NAS Corpus Christi, TX)
 Airborne Mine Countermeasures Weapon Systems Training School (AMCMWPNSYSTRASCOL) (NAS Norfolk, VA)
 Helicopter Sea Combat Weapons School Atlantic (HSCWEPSCOLANT) (NAS Norfolk, VA)
 Airborne Early Warning Wing Atlantic Fleet (AEWWINGLANT) (NAS Norfolk, VA)
 Reserve Carrier Air Wing 20 (CVWR 20) (NAS Atlanta, GA)
 Task Force 42 / Naval Submarine Force Atlantic Fleet (NAVSUBLANT) (NB Norfolk, VA)
 Submarine Group 2 (SUBGRU 2) (NSB New London, CT)
 Naval Submarine Support Center (NB Norfolk, VA)
 Task Force 43 (Training Command Atlantic Fleet?)
 Task Force 44 (Coast Guard Force Atlantic Fleet) / Coast Guard Atlantic Area (Portsmouth, VA)
 Task Force 45 / Fleet Marine Forces Atlantic (MARFORLANT) (Norfolk NB, VA)
 Task Force 46 (Mine Warfare Command Atlantic Fleet (MINEWARCOM)) (NS Ingleside, TX)
 Task Force 48 (Naval Construction Battalions Atlantic Fleet) (NAB Little Creek, VA)
 Task Force 80 (Naval Patrol and Protection of Shipping Atlantic Fleet)
 Task Force 81 (Sea Control and Surveillance Force Atlantic Fleet) / Patrol and Reconnaissance Force Atlantic Fleet (PATRECONFORLANT) (NS Norfolk, VA)
 Task Force 82 (Amphibious Task Force)
 Task Force 83 (Landing Force (II Marine Expeditionary Force (II MEF)) (Camp Lejeune, NC)
 Task Force 84 (ASW Force Atlantic Fleet) / Naval Submarine Force Atlantic Fleet (NAVSUBLANT) (NB Norfolk, VA)
 Task Force 85 (Mobile Logistics Support Force Atlantic Fleet) / Combat Logistics Squadron 2 (LOGRON 2) (NB Norfolk, VA)
 Task Force 86 (Patrol Air Force Atlantic Fleet) / Patrol and Reconnaissance Force Atlantic Fleet (PATRECONFORLANT) (NS Norfolk, VA)
 Patrol and Reconnaissance Wing 5 (PATRECONWING 5) (NAS Brunswick, ME)
 Patrol and Reconnaissance Wing 11 (PATRECONWING 11) (NAS Jacksonville, FL)
 Reserve Patrol Wing (RESPATWING) (NAS Oceana, VA)
 Task Force 87 (Tactical Development and Evaluation and Transit Force Atlantic Fleet)
 Task Force 88 (Training Force Atlantic Fleet) (NB Norfolk, VA)
 Task Force 89 (Maritime Defense Zone Atlantic Fleet) (USCGS Portsmouth, VA)
 Task Force 125 (Naval Surface Group 2 (NAVSURFGRU 2)) (NS Mayport, FL)
 Task Force 137 (Naval Forces Eastern Atlantic) (Naples, Italy)
 Task Force 138 (Naval Forces South Atlantic)
 Task Force 139 (Multilateral Special Operations Force)
 Task Force 142 (Operational Test and Evaluation Force) (NB Norfolk, VA)

United States Marine Corps Forces Command (Norfolk NB, VA) 
 II Marine Expeditionary Force (II MEF) (Camp Lejeune, NC)
 II Marine Expeditionary Force Headquarters Group (II MEF HQ GRP)
 2nd Marine Division (2nd MARDIV) (Camp Lejeune, NC)
 2nd Marine Aircraft Wing (2nd MAW) (MCAS Cherry Point, NC)
 2nd Marine Logistics Group (2nd MLG) (Camp Lejeune, NC)
 2nd Marine Expeditionary Brigade (2nd MEB) (Camp Lejeune, NC)
 22nd Marine Expeditionary Unit (22nd MEU)
 24th Marine Expeditionary Unit (24th MEU)
 26th Marine Expeditionary Unit (26th MEU)
 Marine Corps Security Force Regiment (MCSFR)
 Marine Corps Security Cooperation Group (MCSCG)
 Chemical Biological Incident Response Force (CBIRF) 
 Marine Forces Reserve (MARFORRES) (New Orleans, LA)
 Force Headquarters Group (MARFORRES HQ GRP) (New Orleans, LA)
 4th Marine Division (4th MARDIV) (MARFORRES) (New Orleans, LA)
 4th Marine Aircraft Wing (4th MAW) (MARFORRES) (New Orleans, LA)
 4th Marine Logistics Group (4th MLG) (MARFORRES) (New Orleans, LA)

U.S. Forces Azores (USAFORAZ) (Lajes Field, Azores) 
 65th Air Base Wing (Lajes Field, Azores)

U.S. Space Command 

 Combined Force Space Component Command, Vandenberg Space Force Base, Lompoc, CA - CFSCC is responsible for supporting military commanders around the globe by providing space-based services, including GPS navigation, space-based data, satellite communications, and missile warning
 Combined Space Operations Center, Vandenberg Space Force Base
 Missile Warning Center, Cheyenne Mountain Space Force Station
 Joint Overhead Persistent Infrared Center, Buckley Space Force Base
 Joint Navigation Warfare Center, Kirtland AFB
 Joint Task Force-Space Defense, Schriever Space Force Base, Colorado Springs, CO - JTF-SD is responsible for protecting military satellites from aggression
 National Space Defense Center - Co-located within JTF-SD, NSDC is a joint effort between the Department of Defense and the United States Intelligence Community responsible for detecting, warning, and defending against threats to military space systems, particularly those of the National Reconnaissance Office

U.S. Special Operations Command 

 Commander, USSOCOM: General Richard D. Clarke, USA
 Headquarters, MacDill AFB, Florida
 Army Special Operations Command (Fort Bragg, NC)
 75th Ranger Regiment (Fort Benning, GA)
 160th Special Operations Aviation Regiment (Airborne) (Fort Campbell, KY)
 Special Forces Command (Airborne) (Fort Bragg, NC)
 Special Operations Support Command (Fort Bragg, NC)
 John F. Kennedy Special Warfare Center (Fort Bragg, NC)
 4th Psychological Operations Group (Airborne) (Fort Bragg, NC)
 95th Civil Affairs Brigade (Provisional) (Fort Bragg, NC)
 Naval Special Warfare Command (NAB Coronado, CA)
 Special Warfare Group One (NAB Coronado, CA)
 Special Warfare Group Two (NAB Little Creek, VA)
 Special Boat Squadron One (NAB Coronado, CA)
 Special Boat Squadron Two (NAB Little Creek, VA)
 Naval Special Warfare Center (NAB Coronado, CA)
 Air Force Special Operations Command (Hurlburt Field, FL)
 919th Special Operations Wing (Duke Field, FL)
 18th Flight Test Squadron (Hurlburt Field, FL)
 Air Force Special Operations Command Air Support Operations Squadron (Fort Bragg, NC)
 United States Air Force Special Operations School (Hurlburt Field, FL)
 720th Special Tactics Group (Hurlburt Field, FL)
 16th Special Operations Wing (Hurlburt Field, FL)
 193d Special Operations Wing (Harrisburg IAP, PA)
 352nd Special Operations Group (RAF Mildenhall, UK)
 353rd Special Operations Group (Kadena AB, Japan)
 Marine Special Operations Command
 Marine Raider Regiment
 Marine Raider Support Group
 Marine Special Operations School
 Marine Special Operations Advisor Group
 Joint Special Operations Command (Pope AFB, NC and Fort Bragg, NC)
 Task Force 6-26 (Bagram AB, Afghanistan)
 Task Force 145 (Bagram AB, Afghanistan)
 1st Special Forces Operational Detachment (Airborne) - Delta (Fort Bragg, NC)
 Naval Special Warfare Development Group (Dam Neck, VA)
 24th Special Tactics Squadron (Pope AFB, NC)
 Acquisitions and Logistics Center

U.S. Strategic Command 

 Commander, USSTRATCOM: Admiral Charles A. Richard, USN
 Deputy Commander, USSTRATCOM: Lieutenant General Thomas A. Bussiere, USAF
 Chief of Staff: Rear Admiral William W. Wheeler, USN
 Command Senior Enlisted Leader: Sergeant Major Howard L. Kreamer, USMC

Order of battle 
 United States Strategic Command (USSTRATCOM) (Offutt AFB, NE)
 Joint Information Operations Center (Offutt AFB, NE)
 Strategic Communications Wing 1 (SCW 1) (TACAMO) (E-6B) (Tinker AFB, OK)
 Air Force Global Strike Command (Barksdale Air Force Base, LA)
 20th Air Force (F. E. Warren AFB, WY)
 90th Missile Wing (LGM-118A, LGM-30G, UH-1N) (Francis E Warren AFB, WY)
 91st Missile Wing (LGM-30G, UH-1N) (Minot AFB, ND)
 341st Missile Wing (LGM-30G, UH-1N) (Malmstrom AFB, MT)
 (8th Air Force (Barksdale AFB, LA))
 Naval Submarine Forces (NAVSUBFOR) (NB Norfolk, VA)
 Submarine Force Atlantic Fleet (SUBLANT) (NB Norfolk, VA)
 Submarine Group 10 (SUBGRU 10) (NSB Kings Bay, GA)
 Submarine Force Pacific Fleet (SUBPAC) (NB Pearl Harbor, HI)
 Submarine Group 9 (SUBGRU 9) (NB Kitsap, WA)
 Fleet Forces Command (FFC) (NB Norfolk, VA)
 (Naval Submarine Forces (NAVSUBFOR) (NB Norfolk, VA))
 US Army Space and Missile Defense Command (USARSPACE) / US Army Forces Strategic Command (USARSTRAT) (Arlington, VA)
 100th Missile Defense Brigade (Ground-based Missile Defense) (Peterson AFB, CO)
 Marine Forces Strategic Command (MARFORSTRAT) (Offutt AFB, NE)
 US Naval Network Warfare Command (NETWARCOM) (NAB Little Creek, VA)
 Joint Task Force-Global Network Operations (Offutt AFB, NE)

U.S. Transportation Command 

Commander, USTRANSCOM: General Jacqueline Van Ovost, USAF

Order of battle 
 US Transportation Command (Scott AFB, IL)
 Air Mobility Command (AMC) (Scott AFB, IL)
 18th Air Force (Scott AFB, IL)
 15th Expeditionary Mobility Task Force (Travis AFB, CA)
 60th Air Mobility Wing (C-5A/B/C, KC-10A) (Travis AFB, CA)
 62nd Airlift Wing (C-17A) (McChord AFB, WA)
 317th Airlift Group (C-130H) (Dyess AFB, TX)
 375th Airlift Wing (Operational Support Airlift) (C-21A, C-9A) (Scott AFB, IL)
 22nd Air Refueling Wing (KC-135R/T) (McConnell AFB, KS)
 92nd Air Refueling Wing (KC-135R/T) (Fairchild AFB, WA)
 19th Air Refueling Wing (KC-135R/T) (Grand Forks AFB, ND)
 615th Contingency Response Wing (Travis AFB, CA)
 715th Air Mobility Support Group (Hickam AFB, HI)
 21st Expeditionary Mobility Task Force (McGuire AFB, NJ)
 436th Airlift Wing (C-5A/B) (Dover AFB, DE)
 305th Air Mobility Wing (C-17A, KC-10A) (McGuire AFB, NJ)
 437th Airlift Wing (C-17A) (Charleston AFB, SC)
 43d Airlift Wing (C-130E) (Pope AFB, NC)
 314th Airlift Wing (C-130E/H) (Little Rock AFB, AR)
 89th Airlift Wing (VIP) (VC-25A, VC/C-37A, C-20B, C-32A, C-40B) (Andrews AFB, MD)
 6th Air Mobility Wing (KC-135R, C-37A) (MacDill AFB, FL)
 19th Air Refueling Group (KC-135R, EC-137D) (Robins AFB, GA)
 621st Contingency Response Wing (McGuire AFB, NJ)
 721st Air Mobility Operations Group (Ramstein AB, Germany)
 4th Air Force (AFRes) (McClellan AFB, CA)
 433d Airlift Wing (AFRes) (C-5A) (Lackland AFB, TX)
 445th Airlift Wing (AFRes) (C-5A) (Wright Patterson AFB, OH)
 349th Air Mobility Wing (AFRes) (C-5A/B/C, KC-10A (Associate unit to 60th Air Mobility Wing)) (Travis AFB, CA)
 452d Air Mobility Wing (AFRes) (C-17A, KC-135E) (March ARB, CA)
 446th Airlift Wing (AFRes) (C-17A (Associate unit to 62nd Airlift Wing)) (McChord AFB, WA)
 932d Airlift Wing (Operational Support Airlift) (AFRes) (C-9C (Associate unit to 375th Airlift Wing)) (Scott AFB, IL)
 434th Air Refueling Wing (AFRes) (KC-135R) (Grissom ARB, IN)
 459th Air Refueling Wing (AFRes) (KC-135R) (Andrews AFB, MD)
 507th Air Refueling Wing (AFRes) (KC-135R, E-3B/C, TC-18E) (Tinker AFB, OK)
 916th Air Refueling Wing (AFRes) (KC-125R) (Seymour-Johnson AFB, NC)
 931st Air Refueling Group (AFRes) (KC-135R) (McConnell AFB, KS)
 939th Air Refueling Wing (AFRes) (KC-135R (Portland IAP, OR)
 927th Air Refueling Wing (AFRes) (KC-135E) (Selfridge ANGB, MI)
 940th Air Refueling Wing (AFRes) (KC-135E) (Beale AFB, CA)
 22nd Air Force (AFRes) (Dobbins AFB, GA)
 94th Airlift Wing (AFRes) (C-130H) (Dobbins ARB, GA)
 302d Airlift Wing (AFRes) (C-130H) (Peterson AFB, CO)
 315th Airlift Wing (AFRes) (C-17A) (Associate unit of 437th Airlift Wing)) (Charleston AFB, SC)
 439th Airlift Wing (AFRes) (C-5A) (Westover ARB, MA)
 440th Airlift Wing (AFRes) (C-130H) (Gen. Mitchell ARS, Milwaukee, WI)
 512th Airlift Wing (AFRes) (C-5A/B (Associate unit to 436th Airlift Wing)) (Dover AFB, DE)
 908th Airlift Wing (AFRes) (C-130H) (Maxwell AFB, AL)
 910th Airlift Wing (AFRes) (C-130H) (Youngstown ARS, OH)
 911th Airlift Wing (AFRes) (C-130H) (Greater Pittsburgh IAP, PA)
 914th Airlift Wing (AFRes) (C-130H) (Niagara Falls IAP, NY)
 934th Airlift Wing (AFRes) (C-130E) (Minneapolis St Paul ARS, MN)
 514th Air Mobility Wing (AFRes) (C-17A, KC-10A (Associate unit to 305th Air Mobility Wing)) (McGuire AFB, NJ)
 Air National Guard Airlift
 135th Airlift Group (MD ANG) (C-130J) (Glenn L Martin AP, MD)
 105th Airlift Wing (NY ANG) (C-5A) (Stewart IAP, NY)
 107th Airlift Wing (NY ANG) (C-130H) (Niagara Falls ARS, NY)
 109th Airlift Wing (NY ANG) (C-130H, C-26B) (Schenectedy CAP, NY)
 118th Airlift Wing (TN ANG) (C-130H) (Nashville MP, TN)
 123d Airlift Wing (KY ANG) (C-130H) (Standiford Fd, KY)
 130th Airlift Wing (WV ANG) (C-130H) (Yeager AP, Charleston, WV)
 133d Airlift Wing (MN ANG) (C-130H) (Minneapolis St Paul, MN)
 136th Airlift Wing (TX ANG) (C-130H) (NAS JRB Fort Worth, TX)
 139th Airlift Wing (MO ANG) (C-130H) (Rosecrans MAP, MO)
 143d Airlift Wing (RI ANG) (C-130E) (Quonset Point St AP, RI)
 145th Airlift Wing (NC ANG) (C-130H) (Charlotte IAP, NC
 146th Airlift Wing (CA ANG) (C-130E) (NAWS Pt Mugu, CA)
 152d Airlift Wing (NV ANG) (C-130E/H) (Reno-Tahoe IAP, NV)
 153d Airlift Wing (WY ANG) (C-130H) (Cheyenne MAP, WY)
 164th Airlift Wing (TN ANG) (C-5A) (Memphis IAP, TN)
 165th Airlift Wing (GA ANG) (C-130H) (Savannah IAP, GA)
 166th Airlift Wing (DE ANG) (C-130H) (Greater Wilmington AP, DE)
 167th Airlift Wing (WV ANG) (C-130H) (Martinsburgh AP, WV)
 172d Airlift Wing (MI ANG) (C-17) (Thompson Fd, Jackson, MI)
 179th Airlift Wing (OH ANG) (C-130H) (Mansfield-Lahm AP, OH)
 182d Airlift Wing (IL ANG) (C-130E) (Greater Peoria AP, IL)
 Air National Guard Aerial Refueling
 101st Air Refueling Wing (ME ANG) (KC-135R) (Bangor IAP, ME)
 108th Air Refueling Wing (NJ ANG) (KC-135E) (McGuire AFB, NJ)
 117th Air Refueling Wing (AL ANG) (KC-135R) (Birmingham MAP, AL)
 121st Air Refueling Wing (OH ANG) (KC-135R) (Rickenbacker ANGB, OH)
 126th Air Refueling Wing (IL ANG) (KC-135E) (Chicago-O'Hare IAP, IL)
 134th Air Refueling Wing (TN ANG) (KC-135E) (McGhee-Tyson AP, TN)
 137th Air Refueling Wing (OK ANG) (KC-135) (Tinker AFB, OK)
 141st Air Refueling Wing (WA ANG) (KC-135E, C-26B) (Fairchild AFB, WA)
 151st Air Refueling Wing (UT ANG) (KC-135E) (Salt Lake City IAP, UT)
 157th Air Refueling Wing (NH ANG) (KC-135R) (Pease AFB, NH)
 161st Air Refueling Wing (AZ ANG) (KC-135E) (Phoenix-Sky Harbour AP, AZ)
 171st Air Refueling Wing (PA ANG) (KC-135T) (Greater Pittsburgh IAP, PA)
 185th Air Refueling Wing (IA ANG) (KC-135R) (Sioux City Gateway AP, IA)
 186th Air Refueling Wing (MS ANG) (KC-135R, C-26B) (Key Fd, Meridian, MS)
 190th Air Refueling Wing (KS ANG) (KC-135D/E) (Forbes Fd, Topeka, KS)
 Military Sealift Command (MSC) (Washington Navy Yard, DC)
 Sealift Logistics Command Atlantic (SEALOGLANT) (NB Norfolk, VA)
 Sealift Logistics Command Pacific (SEALOGPAC) (NB San Diego, CA)
 Sealift Logistics Command Europe (SEALOGEUR) (Naples, Italy)
 Sealift Logistics Command Central (SEALOGCENT) (Manama, Bahrain)
 Sealift Logistics Command Far East (SEALOGFE) (Sembawang, Singapore)
 Maritime Prepositioning Force
 Maritime Prepositioning Ship Squadron 2 (MPSRON 2)
 Maritime Prepositioning Ship Squadron 3 (MPSRON 3) (PDS Agana, Guam, effective July 2019)
 Sealift Force
 Naval Fleet Auxiliary Force
 Military Surface Deployment and Distribution Command(Alexandria, VA)
 143d Sustainment Command (USAR) (Orlando, FL)
 7th Transportation Brigade (Ft Eustis, VA)
 32nd Transportation Group (Composite) (USAR) (Tampa, FL)
 300th Transportation Group (Composite) (USAR) (Butler, PA)
 336th Transportation Group (Composite) (USAR) (Ft Sheridan, IL)
 375th Transportation Group (Composite) (USAR) (Mobile, AL)
 1179th Deployment Support Brigade (USAR) (Ft Hamilton, NY)
 1190th Deployment Support Brigade (USAR) (Baton Rouge, LA)
 1394th Deployment Support Brigade (USAR) (Cp Pendleton, CA)
 1176th Transportation Terminal Brigade (USAR) (Baltimore, MD)
 1185th Transportation Terminal Brigade (USAR) (Lancaster, PA)
 1192nd Transportation Terminal Brigade (USAR) (New Orleans, LA)
 1186th Transportation Terminal Brigade (USAR) (Jacksonville, FL)
 1189th Transportation Terminal Brigade (USAR) (Charleston, SC)
 1395th Transportation Terminal Brigade (USAR) (Seattle, WA)
 1397th Transportation Terminal Brigade (USAR) (Port Hueneme, California)
 595th Transportation Brigade (Camp Arifjan, Kuwait)
 596th Transportation Brigade (Military Ocean Terminal Sunny Point, Southport, NC)
 597th Transportation Brigade (Fort Eustis, Virginia)
 598th Transportation Brigade (Rotterdam, Netherlands)
 599th Transportation Brigade (Wheeler Army Airfield, Hawaii)

See also

 United States Army
 United States Marine Corps
 United States Navy
 United States Air Force
United States Space Force

References

External links
 US Armed Forces Order of Battle - June 2008

United States Armed Forces